Siah Marz may refer to:
 Siah Marz-e Gavabar